The 2019 President of the Federal Senate of Brazil election took place on 2 February 2019, originally one day before, following the opening day of the 56th Legislature of the National Congress, almost four months after the 2018 elections.

The Acting President of the Federal Senate, Davi Alcolumbre (DEM–AP), administered the oath of office of the members of the Senate and the Dean of the Federal Senate, José Maranhão (MDB–PB), administered the session of election for President.

Former President Renan Calheiros ran for a fifth term as President, but withdrawn the election and was defeated by Alcolumbre.

Candidates

Confirmed candidates
 Davi Alcolumbre (DEM) - Senator from Amapá since 2015; Federal Deputy from Amapá 2003–2015.
 Angelo Coronel (PSD) - Senator for Bahia taking office in 2019; President of the Legislative Assembly of Bahia 2017–2018; State Deputy of Bahia since 2003, 2001–2002, 1995–1999; Mayoir of Coração de Maria 1989–1993.
 Esperidião Amin (PP) - Senator for Santa Catarina taking office in 2019, 1991–1999; Federal Deputy from Santa Catarina since 2011; Governor of Santa Catarina 1999–2003, 1983–1987; Mayor of Florianópolis 1989–1990, 1975–1978.
 José Reguffe (I) - Senator for Federal District since 2015; Federal Deputy for Federal District 2011–2015; District Deputy of Federal District 2007–2011.
 Fernando Collor de Mello (PROS) - Senator for Alagoas since 2007; 32nd President of Brazil 1990–1992; 55th Governor of Alagoas 1987–1989; Federal Deputy from Alagoas 1983–1987; 57th Mayor of Maceió 1979–1983.

Lost in conventions
 Simone Tebet (MDB) - Senator for Mato Grosso do Sul since 2015; Vice Governor of Mato Grosso do Sul 2011–2015; Secretary of Government of Mato Grosso do Sul 2013–2014; Mayor of Três Lagoas 2005–2010; State Deputy of Mato Grosso do Sul 2003–2005.

Withdrawn candidates
 Tasso Jereissati (PSDB) - Senator for Ceará since 2015, 2003–2011; Governor of Ceará 1995–2002, 1987–1991.
 Renan Calheiros (MDB) - Senator for Alagoas since 1995; President of the Federal Senate 2013–2017, 2005–2007; Minister of Justice 1998–1999; Federal Deputy from Alagoas 1983–1991; State Deputy of Alagoas 1979–1983.
 Major Olímpio (PSL) - Senator for São Paulo taking office in 2019; Federal Deputy from São Paulo since 2015; State Deputy of São Paulo 2007–2015.
 Alvaro Dias (PODE) - Senator for Paraná since 1999, 1983–1987; Governor of Paraná 1987–1991; Federal Deputy from Paraná 1975–1983; State Deputy of Paraná 1971–1975; City Councillor of Londrina 1969–1971.

Formal voting

References

2019 elections in Brazil
February 2019 events in Brazil
President of the Federal Senate of Brazil elections